The thermodynamic properties of materials are intensive thermodynamic parameters which are specific to a given material. Each is directly related to a second order differential of a thermodynamic potential. Examples for a simple 1-component system are:

 Compressibility (or its inverse, the bulk modulus)
 Isothermal compressibility

 Adiabatic compressibility

 Specific heat (Note - the extensive analog is the heat capacity)
 Specific heat at constant pressure

 Specific heat at constant volume

 Coefficient of thermal expansion

where P  is pressure, V  is volume, T  is temperature, S  is entropy, and N  is the number of particles.

For a single component system, only three second derivatives are needed in order to derive all others, and so only three material properties are needed to derive all others. For a single component system, the "standard" three parameters are the isothermal compressibility , the specific heat at constant pressure , and the coefficient of thermal expansion .

For example, the following equations are true:

The three "standard" properties are in fact the three possible second derivatives of the Gibbs free energy with respect to temperature and pressure. In fact,  one property function can be given as an expression of the two others, up to a reference state value.

The second principle of thermodynamics has implications on the sign of some thermodynamic properties such isothermal compressibility.

See also 

 List of materials properties (thermal properties)
 Heat capacity ratio
 Statistical mechanics
 Thermodynamic equations
 Thermodynamic databases for pure substances
 Heat transfer coefficient
 Latent heat
 Specific heat of melting (Enthalpy of fusion)
 Specific heat of vaporization (Enthalpy of vaporization)
 Thermal mass

External links
 The Dortmund Data Bank is a factual data bank for thermodynamic and thermophysical data.

References

 

Thermodynamic properties